Wetter (Hessen) is a small town in Hesse, Germany. The rather unusual designation Wetter (Hessen-Nassau) stems from a time when the town belonged to the Prussian province of the same name, and nowadays is only used by the railway – even today, the railway station in town bears this name.

Geography
Wetter lies in the Marburg-Biedenkopf district on the western edge of the Burgwald, a low range of hills, in the Wetschaft valley and neighbouring places about 14 km north of Marburg.

Neighbouring communities
To the north, Wetter borders on the town of Rosenthal in Waldeck-Frankenberg district, to the east on the town of Rauschenberg and the community of Cölbe, to the south on the community of Lahntal, to the southwest on the community of Dautphetal, and to the southwest on the town of Biedenkopf and the community of Münchhausen am Christenberg, all in the Marburg-Biedenkopf district.

Transport
North to south through the town's municipal area runs the Federal Highway (Bundesstraße) B 252 from eastern Westphalia by way of Korbach and Frankenberg and on to Göttingen (in the community of Lahntal). To divert heavy traffic away from places in the Wetschaft valley, a bypass road is planned.

The Burgwaldbahn railway line connects the town with Marburg and Frankenberg. The Kurhessenbahn which runs the line means to reopen the extension between Frankenberg and Korbach.

History

Wetter was already being mentioned in documents in the 8th and 9th centuries; it was mentioned in one such document under the same name that it still has today in 1108, and the "Weistum of Wetter" was already displaying its town rights even as early as 1239.

Politics

Town council

As of municipal elections held on 26 March 2006, the seats on Wetter Town Council are apportioned thus:

Coat of arms
Wetter's civic coat of arms might be described thus: In Or on a three-knolled hill vert a fleur-de-lis twig vert with three blossoms argent flanked by two inescutcheons, dexter in azure the Hessian Lion rampant gules and argent sinister; sinister in gules the wheel of Mainz argent.

The two inescutcheons (smaller shields within the main one) hark back to the time when the Hessian Landgraves held sway (the Hessian Lion), and to the Archbishops of Mainz (the wheel of Mainz).

Constituent communities

 Amönau
 Mellnau
 Niederwetter
 Oberndorf
 Oberrosphe
 Todenhausen
 Treisbach
 Unterrosphe
 Warzenbach
 Wetter

Culture and sightseeing

Buildings

The Gothic monastery church (13th century).
Town Hall – in the upper floors slated half-timbering with a spire skylight, built about 1680. The ground floor is massive. Recently expanded.
Former synagogue – (once a storeroom, since renovated and turned into an event room). Two-floor square half-timbered building with polygonal ridge turret, late 19th century.
Houses – The compact and picturesque townscape consists first and foremost of half-timbered houses with forward-facing gables, most of which have slate roofs or plasterwork. After several town fires, only a few buildings from before 1629 have still been preserved. Some houses exhibit Classicist doors.
Remains of the mediaeval town wall with two towers.

The houses at the following addresses are worth mentioning:
Markt 7 – Three-floor house with forward-facing gable and a corner oriel window. On the stone ground floor a pretty Renaissance portal, marked 1570.
Markt 8 – 17th century.
Markt 9 – Three-floor house with forward-facing gable, presumably from the first third of the 16th century, second upper floor added about 1700.
Markt 14 – Baroque half-timbered building with ornamental carvings, presumably from the late 17th century.
Krämergasse 14 – House with side gables with carved infilling boards, dated 1671.
Krämergasse 10 – Two-floor half-timbered building, possibly from first quarter of the  16th century.

Regular events
Every seven years, the town holds its Grenzgangfest, recalling a time when patrolling the town's boundaries was necessary to prevent neighbourly encroachment. The next Grenzgangfest is in 2022.

Sons and daughters of the town

 Friedrich Sylburg (1536-1596), publisher
 Johannes Cuchlinus (1546-1606), pastor and founding regent of the theological college at Leiden University 
 Hermann Vultejus (1555–1634), German jurist 
 Oswald Croll (1560-1608), physician and pharmacist
 Fred Steinfort (born 1952), American Football player

Partner towns
  Deutschkreutz, Austria
  Oostrozebeke, Belgium
  Reinsdorf, Saxony-Anhalt

References

External links

  

Marburg-Biedenkopf